Max FM, formerly Radio Continental, is an English Nigerian FM radio station that is based in Lagos. It also has a sister radio station under the same brand in Abuja.

History

Radio Continental 

Radio Continental started under the name Link FM with its first transmission in 102.3 FM in Lagos. After ten months it was rebranded Unity 102.3 FM, with focus on general entertainment, news and sports.

Max 102.3 FM Lagos 
On 21 October 2017, TVC Communications had an event at the Federal Palace Hotel in Lagos to celebrate the launching of 102.3 Max FM. The station added presenters Murphy Ijemba and Shine Begho, and retained presenters Wale PowPowPow of Wetin Day programme and Jones Usen of TVC News. TVC said the station will play music for the 15-34 demographic. TVC Communications also replaced Continental Broadcasting Services as the trading name for the business units.

Max 90.9 FM Abuja 

In September 2018, TVC Communications launched Max 90.9 FM in Abuja. The station will follow the same music hits format as the Lagos station.  Programmes and presenters include Max Breakfast with Jennifer Nzewunwah and Eyo Henry, Max Hits with Azuka Nsonwu; Watin Dey with Wale PowPowPow, Max Drive with Naomi Oboyi; Max Mix with Nellie, as well as shows from Jones Usen and Murphy Ijemba.

References

Radio stations in Lagos
Radio stations established in 2005
Radio stations established in 2017
2005 establishments in Nigeria
Contemporary hit radio stations